The Libera Università Maria SS. Assunta, often simply abbreviated as "LUMSA", is a private Roman Catholic university founded in 1939 in Rome. It is the second oldest university in Rome after Sapienza.

LUMSA was privately founded but belongs to the national Italian network of universities and is therefore able to confer recognised degrees and diploma titles which have full legal force. The principal aspects of LUMSA are to be found in its humanist vocation and Catholic orientation. It has a humanist vocation because in a society which is scientifically and technologically advanced there is a growing awareness of the need for ‘wise knowledge’ which is rooted in an authentic idea of man and is able to promote progress for the real good of man and the human community. LUMSA belongs to the national and international scientific research network and has research programmes which operate within certain specific areas: education, the social services, the philosophical, philological and literary sciences, mass communications, juridical sciences, economics, computer science and data science.

Organization
The university began its life as the "Istituto Superiore di Magistero Maria Ss. Assunta", an educational institute for nuns founded in 1939 by Luigia Tincani (Royal Decree no. 1760 of 26 October 1939). In 1989 it was reconstituted as "Libera Università Maria SS. Assunta" (LUMSA), a university for women. The university was opened to men in 1991.

LUMSA is a private Catholic institution with autonomy at all levels of the university. As an Italian accredited institution, its degrees are considered equivalent to those issued by Italian public universities.

The university is governed by a Council which includes a President, a Rector, two Pro-Rectors, a Director General, and general council members. Since 2017, the President has been Cardinal Giovanni Lajolo.

University teaching is distributed across three departments:
 Department of Law, Economics, Politics and Modern languages (Rome)
 Department of Law (Palermo)
 Department of Human Studies, Communication, Education, and Psychology (Rome).

Research
Research and study activities, which are the vital lymph source of every university system, are always characterised in LUMSA by involvement in cultural and scientific dialogue about the great subjects of contemporary debate. Over the years the research activities of the faculties of the university have given rise to a great deal of individual and group research which has been flanked over time by inter-university and international research financed by public and private agencies, by structures providing such services, and by funds provided by the university itself. At the present time research activity is organised around the various research centres of the three faculties.

Teaching
LUMSA University is characterised by the duality of tradition and modernity because it integrates humanistic and classical knowledge with economics, information technology and management. Another characteristic of this university is the emphasis it places on students deserving of financial help. Indeed, the overall level of the fees for the first income band has been made almost the same as that in state universities.

The educational structure of LUMSA is arranged around four divisions. The university offers, through the divisions, undergraduate degrees (Italian laurea) in various social science fields and in data science. In post-graduate education, LUMSA offers several graduate programs and two long-cycle programs in law and education sciences, as well as four PhDs (Italian dottorato di ricerca).

Notable people and alumni
 Joseph Ratzinger (future Pope Benedict XVI), honorary degree in Law, 1999
 Liliana Segre, honorary degree in International relations, 2020
 Sergio Cotta, honorary degree in law, 1999
 Liliana Cavani, honorary degree in Communication sciences, 1999
 Carlo Lizzani, honorary degree in Media studies, 2009
 Giuseppe Pizzardo, co-founder
 Luigi Traglia, president
 Mario Luigi Ciappi, president
 Antonio María Javierre Ortas, president
 Carlo Furno, president
 Attilio Nicora, president
 Cornelio Fabro, director
 Conte Giuseppe Dalla Torre del Tempio di Sanguinetto, rector between 1991 and 2014

See also
 List of Italian universities
 BioGeM consortium

References

External links

LUMSA University Website 
LUMSA Guidance and tutoring
LUMSA professional masters in English

Libera Università Maria SS. Assunta
Educational institutions established in 1939
1939 establishments in Italy